Equipe or Équipe may refer to:

Équipe
Équipe may refer to:

 team, in French language
 L'Équipe, a French newspaper devoted to sports
 L'Équipe (TV series), a television series broadcast in many versions and in many countries (known also as The Team)
 L'Équipe (TV channel)

Equipe
Equipe may refer to:

 Bond Equipe, a car

See also

 L'Équipeur
 
 
 
 
 Equip (disambiguation)

fr:Équipe